Dudi may refer to:

As a given name
Dudi is a diminutive of Dawid, the Hebrew form of David.

Dudi Appleton, American journalist
Dudi Fadlon, Israeli footballer
Dudi Maia Rosa, Brazilian artist
Dudi Sela (born 1985), Israeli tennis player

As a surname
Nadia Arop Dudi, (born 1971), South Sudanese politician
Rameshwar Lal Dudi, Indian politician
Ramnarayan Dudi, Indian politician
Chetan Dudi, Indian politician

Other
Chomana Dudi, film